Burnay can refer to:

Burnay Palace,  a palace in Lisbon, Portugal
Burnay Ifugao language, a dialect of the Ifugao language
Burnay jar, a large glazed earthen jar used for fermenting food products in the Philippines